Teófilo Benito (22 July 1966 in Alcolea de Calatrava – 15 August 2004 in Madrid) was a Spanish middle distance runner, who specialized in the 1500 metres.

Benito competed at the 1987 and 1991 World Championships, reaching the semi-final heat on both occasions. He won a bronze medal at the 1987 Mediterranean Games and finished fourteenth at the 1986 Goodwill Games.

References

1966 births
2004 deaths
Spanish male middle-distance runners
Mediterranean Games bronze medalists for Spain
Mediterranean Games medalists in athletics
Athletes (track and field) at the 1987 Mediterranean Games
Competitors at the 1986 Goodwill Games
20th-century Spanish people